The Guelph Film Festival is an annual Canadian film festival, staged in Guelph, Ontario. Launched in 1984, the festival programs an annual lineup of documentary films, focusing on themes such as social justice, the environment and community building.

Films are screened at a variety of venues throughout the city, including the University of Guelph, the Guelph Public Library, the Guelph Civic Museum, the Boarding House Gallery, the Macdonald Stewart Art Centre and various cafés and pubs in the downtown core.

References

External links

Film festivals in Ontario
Festivals in Guelph
Documentary film festivals in Canada
1984 establishments in Ontario
Film festivals established in 1984